The Leopaard Mattu is a compact crossover produced by Changfeng Motor of GAC Group under the Leopaard brand.

Overview

The Leopaard Mattu is based on the same platform as the Leopaard CS10 compact crossover but was aimed to be positioned slightly above as a more premium option with prices ranging from 116,800 to 158,800 yuan. 

The Leopaard Mattu is powered by from BMW's CE16 1.6 liter turbo direct injection engine with a maximum power of 200hp and a peak torque of 270 Nm, with the engine mated to either a 6-speed manual transmission or a 6-speed dual-clutch transmission.
The Leopaard Mattu features a front McPherson and the multi-link independent rear suspension.

References

External links

official website

Crossover sport utility vehicles
Front-wheel-drive vehicles
Cars introduced in 2018
Changfeng Motor vehicles